Daniel Kenneth Lucas (born February 28, 1958) is a Canadian former professional ice hockey right winger who played six National Hockey League (NHL) games for the Philadelphia Flyers during the  season. He was drafted by the Flyers in the first round (14th overall) of the 1978 NHL Amateur Draft. 

In 1977-78, Lucas was Wayne Gretzky’s right winger with the Sault Ste. Marie Greyhounds.

Career statistics

References

External links
 

1958 births
Canadian ice hockey right wingers
Fort Worth Texans players
Living people
Maine Mariners players
National Hockey League first-round draft picks
People from Powell River, British Columbia
Philadelphia Flyers draft picks
Philadelphia Flyers players
Sault Ste. Marie Greyhounds players
UBC Thunderbirds players
Victoria Cougars (WHL) players
Ice hockey people from British Columbia